The R439 road is a regional road in Ireland linking Birr with Banagher in County Offaly.

The road begins with a junction on the N52 road at Emmet Square at the centre of Birr Town and continues northwards taking the following routes through the town; Green Street, Rosse Row, Model School Road, Eden Road & Cappaneale. The road continues northwards forming a crossroads junction with the R438 at Taylor's Cross. The road continues into Banagher as Birr Road & Main Street. The route terminates in Main Street at the junction with the R356.

See also
National primary road
National secondary road
Roads in Ireland

References
Roads Act 1993 (Classification of Regional Roads) Order 2006 – Department of Transport

Regional roads in the Republic of Ireland
Roads in County Offaly
Roads in County Tipperary